Tarampuk (also Romanized as Tarāmpūk) is a village in Kahir Rural District, in the Central District of Konarak County, Sistan and Baluchestan Province, Iran. At the 2006 census, its population was 24, in 9 families.

References 

Populated places in Konarak County